Charles Chinedu Ezeh (born 18 November 1997) is a Nigerian professional footballer who plays as a midfielder.

Career
In July 2017, Ezeh signed a four-year contract with Tippeligaen side Lillestrøm. In the summer of 2018, he went on loan to Strømmen. He returned to Lillestrøm at the end of 2018, only to move on to Hamkam on loan. In the spring of 2021 Lillestrøm decided to release Ezeh when his contract expired on 30 June.

Career statistics

References

1997 births
Living people
Sportspeople from Jos
Nigerian footballers
Nigerian expatriate footballers
Nigerian expatriate sportspeople in Norway
Expatriate footballers in Norway
Association football midfielders
Lillestrøm SK players
Strømmen IF players
Hamarkameratene players
Skeid Fotball players
Øygarden FK players
Eliteserien players
Norwegian First Division players